Verkhniye Kotly is a station on the Moscow Central Circle of the Moscow Metro that opened in September 2016.

Name
The station is named for the former village of Verkhniye Kotly, which was annexed to Moscow in 1932. The name of the station was changed from the originally planned Varshavskoye Shosse in August 2016.

References

External links 
 mkzd.ru

Moscow Metro stations
Railway stations in Russia opened in 2016
Moscow Central Circle stations